İznik Ultramarathon, shortly İznik Ultra, is an international trail running ultramarathon event that takes place at İznik town of Bursa Province in northwestern Turkey. It was established in 2012 with the first race held on 14-15 April. Lasting two days, the race is Turkey's longest single stage athletic event.

The winners are bestowed with medals specially made out of İznik pottery, which made the town famous in the Ottoman Empire era.

In 2013, 250 athletes from 17 nations participated at the event. The race for 2014 is scheduled on 19-20 April.

İznik Ultra
Lake İznik is located northeast of Bursa, and the historic city of İznik (formerly Nicaea) is situated at the eastern shore of the lake. The trail running race starts at the square in front of Hagia Sophia Museum in the town center, and leaves İznik on its south through Yenişehir Gate. From there on, the route follows north of the lake. Qualification time is limited by 25 hours. İznik Ultra is accredited for giving three points to the North Face Ultra-Trail du Mont-Blanc.

Orhangazi Ultra
Time limit is 13 hours. The event gives two points to the North Face Ultra-Trail du Mont-Blanc.

İznik Mountain Marathon
Time limit is 8 hours.

İznik 10k
İznik 10k is a ( fun run held in the town and partly along the lake shore on the second day of the İznik Ultra event. The race starts in the square before the Hagia Sophia Museum, runs in the city streets and along the historic city walls. After continuing along the lake shore, the route enters the city again and ends in the town square. The major part of the route is paved with asphalt or cobblestone while only 10% of it is unpaved as dirt road or gravel road.

Winners
Key:

Notable participants
 Amy Sproston, 2012 World champion in 100k.

References

Ultramarathons
İznik
Orhangazi
Sport in Bursa
2012 establishments in Turkey
Annual events in Turkey
Marathons in Turkey
Recurring sporting events established in 2012
Spring (season) events in Turkey